Albert Sing (7 April 1917 – 31 August 2008) was a German footballer and football manager.

He played for 1. FC Eislingen, Stuttgarter Kickers, VfR Mannheim and TSG Ulm 1846 and capped twice for Germany.

References

External links

1917 births
2008 deaths
German footballers
Germany international footballers
Stuttgarter Kickers players
SSV Ulm 1846 players
German football managers
BSC Young Boys managers
Stuttgarter Kickers managers
VfB Stuttgart managers
TSV 1860 Munich managers
FC St. Gallen managers
FC Luzern managers
FC Zürich managers
Grasshopper Club Zürich managers
Bundesliga managers
VfR Mannheim players
FC Chiasso managers
FC Lugano managers
Association football midfielders
1. FC Normannia Gmünd managers
FC Fribourg managers